Rufus Porter may refer to:

Rufus Porter (painter) (1792–1884), American painter, inventor, and founder of Scientific American magazine
Rufus Porter (American football), American football linebacker in the National Football League